Lu Li (born August 30, 1976) is a Chinese gymnast.

Lu made the Chinese national team in late 1991.  However, liver illness almost prevented her from competing in the Olympic Games.  In April 1992, just a few months before the Barcelona Games, she made her international debut at the World Championships in Paris, where her highly innovative uneven bars routine caught the attention of the gymnastics world.  She only placed 4th because of a large step on the dismount, (although she was the leading gymnast in qualifying for the final).

Lu is best known for her gold medal on the uneven bars in the 1992 Summer Olympics in Barcelona.  She won this with a perfect 10, which she achieved the same night as Lavinia Miloșovici also scored a perfect 10. Lu Li and Lavinia Miloșovici remain the last two people to score perfect 10s in Olympic competition to date. Lu Li also won a silver on the beam in the same games (tied with American Shannon Miller with a score of 9.912). This makes Lu Li China's second most successful female Olympic gymnast after Liu Xuan. Lu had troubles on her beam performance in the all-round competition, and placed a disappointing 34th.

Lu competed in the 1993 Chinese National Games and won the uneven bars title (tied with Luo Li, who would go on to win the 1994 World Championships in Brisbane).  She retired shortly thereafter.

In 2000, Lu Li moved to California and was a coach there.  She married Kim David Gussenhoven and has a son named J.  She moved to North Carolina in 2007, still as a coach. In 2009, Lu Li moved to Stockton, California and coached at Champion Gymnastics Academy. On September 1, 2009, Li, Kim, and J moved to Washington and she was hired to coach at Emerald City Gymnastics in Redmond. Recently, she has started coaching gymnasts in Gig Harbor.  Li then coached at Tech Gymnastics (formerly Eastside Gymnastics Academy) in Woodinville, WA. Currently Li coaches at Black Hills Gymnastics in Lacey, WA.

References

1976 births
Living people
Chinese female artistic gymnasts
Gymnasts at the 1992 Summer Olympics
Medalists at the 1992 Summer Olympics
Olympic gold medalists for China
Olympic silver medalists for China
Olympic medalists in gymnastics
People from Ningxiang
Sportspeople from Changsha
Gymnasts from Hunan
20th-century Chinese women